People with the last name Mercati:
Michele Mercati (8 April 1541 – 25 June 1593) an Italian physician 
Giovanni Mercati (17 December 1866 – 23 August 1957) an Italian cardinal of the Roman Catholic Church